Dragon Stadium may refer to:

Football (soccer)
Estádio do Dragão, in Porto, Portugal

American football
Dragon Stadium, Southlake, Texas, USA
Dragon Stadium, Round Rock ISD